Kim Pan-gon (born 1 May 1969) is a South Korean football manager who is the current manager of the Malaysia national football team.

Early life 
Kim was born into a family of peasants in Jinju, a small town in South Gyeongsang Province, South Korea. He was the youngest of five children and his family used to set up stalls to sell food 5 kilometers outside of Jinju every Friday. Kim loved football, but the junior high school he attended did not have a team of its own. In order to play football in high school, he enrolled in Changshin High School in Masan, a one-hour drive from his hometown, and Honam University, a famous non-traditional football school.

Club career
Kim attracted Ulsan Hyundai Horang-i manager Cha Bum-kun's attention during his university years and started his professional career at Ulsan in 1992. However, he didn't show memorable performance and moreover he had to undergo seven surgeries due to a shin injury in his third year. He transferred to another K League club Jeonbuk Hyundai Dinos in 1997, but eventually he couldn't overcome the aftereffect of his injury, stopping playing in South Korea since that year.

Kim became a high school coach for a while after his retirement, but he left for Hong Kong to return to the pitch. He joined Instant-Dict (now Double Flower) in 2000 and started to play in Hong Kong First Division League. He contributed to a Hong Kong FA Cup title while playing for Instant-Dict. He moved to Buler Rangers in 2002 and played as a player-coach for two years.

Managerial career

Busan IPark
Kim returned to South Korea in 2004 and obtained the AFC Professional Football Coaching Diploma, Asia's highest-level coaching license. At that time, only five other South Koreans held the same qualification. In 2005, he became Busan IPark's assistant coach under manager Ian Porterfield.

During four years at Busan, Kim helped his team as caretaker manager whenever they had urgent situations. He won Busan's first victory of the 2006 season in his second match as Busan's manager on 8 April 2006 after predecessor Porterfield failed to get a victory in 21 consecutive matches, and achieved four consecutive victories in that month. This sudden change was called the "Pan-gon's Magic" by Korean media. He returned as the assistant coach when André Egli became a replacement for Porterfield in July. However, Egli abruptly announced his resignation while attending field training in the United States in June 2007, and Kim once again managed Busan as caretaker manager for the remainder of the season. Busan quickly recruited Park Sung-hwa as their new manager in July, but Park left for the South Korean Olympic team after just 17 days.

South China and Hong Kong 
Kim became the manager of Hong Kong First Division League club South China in November 2008. Under Kim, South China won the 2009 Lunar New Year Cup after defeating league all-star team and Sparta Prague. After contributing to South China's league title in the 2008–09 season, he started to manage Hong Kong national teams at the same time. Kim and South China also won 2–0 over Tottenham Hotspur in a pre-season friendly, and advanced to the semi-finals in the 2009 AFC Cup. He finished his best year by leading Hong Kong national under-23 team to an East Asian Games title.

On 11 December 2010, after a 3–4 defeat to Kitchee, Kim Pan-gon resigned from the post of South China team manager, citing health reasons that required him to recuperate back in South Korea.

Gyeongnam FC 
On 26 November 2010, Kim was transferred position from manager to physical fitness consultant of South China, and he will return to South Korea later to serve as a tactical consultant for K League side Gyeongnam FC. Kim told the media that due to minor heart and liver problems, it is not suitable for him to be the manager of South China. It is convenient to stay in South Korea for medical treatment. Earlier, he was invited by Gyeongnam to be the manager, but Kim only agreed to serve as a tactical consultant, and his family would continue to stay in Hong Kong. However, due to the health of his wife living in Hong Kong, he returned to Hong Kong after one season.

Return to Hong Kong
Kim suddenly appeared in Hong Kong on 5 October 2011, claiming to the media that his health has recovered and he has applied last week to the Hong Kong Football Association (HKFA) to be the new Hong Kong national team coach. He also confirmed that his contract with Gyeongnam FC still has one year to run, but he will be released if he is appointed by the HKFA.

Kim was appointed as National Academy coach by the HKFA on 22 December 2011. He was wholly responsible for the identification, development and coaching of all players aged 18 and below. He took up the position of acting manager of Hong Kong national football team in November 2012 following the resignation of former manager Ernie Merrick. Afterwards, the HKFA confirmed Kim as the permanent manager of the Hong Kong national football team on 28 May 2013. He signed a two-and-a-half-year contract with the HKFA.

According to Kim, most of the Hong Kongese players do not have an environment where they can comfortably focus on football, where most of the players are semi-professionals. Kim took this into consideration and used the short time as efficiently as possible. The focus was on physical strength and organization. Hong Kong players worked together through strengthening training for about two to three days a week. Kim led the Hong Kong under-23 team to the knockout stage of the 2014 Asian Games after earning 7 points in the group stage, but they were eliminated by eventual champions South Korea in the round of 16. In December 2015, HKFA announced that they will renew Kim's contract until June 2018. During the 2018 FIFA World Cup qualifiers, Hong Kong's two 0–0 draws with China not only attracted new fans to support the Hong Kong team but also increased Kim's popularity.

However, Kim was gradually criticised by failing to qualify for the 2019 AFC Asian Cup and recruiting too many foreign players. During the match against North Korea, some fans held up the "Kim Out" slogan and asked Kim to resign due to bad performances in the Asian Cup qualification. "Kim Out" slogans flooded social media as well, criticising Kim's conservative tactics and failure to play offensive football, making it difficult for Hong Kong to easily win. Hong Kong fans also criticised that after Kim took the office, the number of naturalised players in the team increased greatly, making it difficult for local youth to find opportunities to fight for places in the starting lineup. Some naturalised players of the team were fairly old, such as centre-back Festus Baise from Nigeria and midfielder Itaparica from Brazil, who were both well over 37 years old at the time. Kim replied to the fans regarding the influx of naturalised player on an interview in December 2019, saying "Hong Kong is an international city, everyone wants to be a Hong Konger and everyone wants to fight for the citizens of Hong Kong. Why aren't they [naturalised players] welcomed?".

In December 2017, Kim resigned as Hong Kong coach to become technical director of the Korean Football Association.

Korea Football Association 
On 26 December 2017, Kim was appointed as Korea Football Association (KFA)'s vice-president and head of reinforcement committee. He planned long-term project to change the future of South Korean football like when he managed Hong Kong national team. He put emphasis on sports science and made football science team in the KFA to approach to players' treatment, recovery and weight training scientifically. After setting the direction of Korean football towards "proactive football", he employed Paulo Bento as national team's manager in person, and honestly disclosed his hiring process to the press.

Malaysia 
On 21 January 2022, the Football Association of Malaysia (FAM) announced that they had hired Kim as the new national team head coach. He resigned as the technical director of the Korean Football Association and took a flight to Malaysia in mid-February with four coaching staff, comprising analysis and fitness officers, assistant coaches, and technical trainers. Kim was offered a two-year contract that runs until 2024 and would be extended if FAM is satisfied with the performance of the national squad in the future.

On 15 June 2022, he managed to help the Malayan Tigers qualify for the 2023 AFC Asian Cup after 42 years since the last time the Malaysian national football team qualified for the prestigious tournament with merit.

Before the opening of the 2022 AFF Championship, Kim selected 41 players for preliminary squad for the competition, but Tunku Ismail Idris, the crown prince of Johor and the owner of Johor Darul Ta'zim, refused to release his key players. The AFF Championship was not essential tournament approved by FIFA, and clubs did not need to send players mandatorily. Therefore, Kim called up new players including naturalised players, and focused on testing new players whether they were worthy of national players or not. However, the players advanced to the semi-finals as group runners-up after earning three victories with good performances in the Group B, where they competed with Vietnam, Myanmar, Singapore and Laos. Their possibility was continued to the semi-final first leg where they defeated defending champions Thailand 1–0, but the first-leg win was followed by a 3–0 loss.

Personal life
Kim obtained Hong Kong permanent residency after living there for seven years. His wife, son and daughter currently resides in Hong Kong.

Managerial statistics

Honours

Player 
Ulsan Hyundai Horang-i
K League 1: 1996
Korean League Cup: 1995

Instant-Dict
Hong Kong FA Cup: 2000–01

Buler Rangers
Hong Kong FA Cup runner-up: 2002–03

Individual
Hong Kong FA Top Footballers: 2002–03

Manager 
South China
Hong Kong First Division League: 2008–09, 2009–10
Hong Kong Senior Challenge Shield: 2009–10

Hong Kong U23 
East Asian Games: 2009

Individual
Hong Kong FA Coach of the Year: 2010

References

External links
Kim Pan-gon's interview with Football Asia SC

1969 births
Living people
Association football midfielders
South Korean footballers
South Korean football managers
South Korean expatriate footballers
South Korean expatriate sportspeople in Hong Kong
Expatriate footballers in Hong Kong
K League 1 players
Ulsan Hyundai FC players
Jeonbuk Hyundai Motors players
Busan IPark managers
South China AA managers
People from Jinju
South Korean expatriate football managers
Hong Kong League XI representative players
Malaysia national football team managers
Sportspeople from South Gyeongsang Province